Alyona Ihorivna Sotnikova (born 5 May 1992) is a Ukrainian former tennis player. She achieved career-high WTA rankings of 315 in singles and 237 in doubles.

ITF Circuit finals

Singles: 13 (8 titles, 5 runner-ups)

Doubles: 37 (24 titles, 13 runner-ups)

References

External links
 
 

1992 births
Living people
Sportspeople from Kharkiv
Ukrainian female tennis players
21st-century Ukrainian women